George Anania (July 14, 1941 – April 5, 2013) was a Romanian science-fiction writer and translator.

Born in Măgurele, Ilfov County, he graduated from the University of Bucharest in 1964.

Published books

Novels
 Corsarul de fier (1966)
 Test de fiabilitate (1981), Editura Albatros
 O experiență neobișnuită (1989), Editura Ion Creangă
 Acțiunea Lebăda (1991), Editura Ion Creangă

With Romulus Bărbulescu 
 Constelația din ape (1962), Colecția "Povestiri științifico-fantastice" nr. 174–179 (English: Constellations from the Waters)
 Captiv în inima Galaxiei (1964), CPSF 226
 Statuia șarpelui (1967), Editura Tineretului
 Doando (1969) – Editura Tineretului
 Planeta umbrelelor albastre (1969), Colecția "Povestiri științifico-fantastice" nr. 356-359
 Ferma oamenilor de piatră (1970), Editura Tineretului (en. The Stone Men Farm)
 Paralela-enigmă (1973), Editura Tineretului
 Șarpele blând al infinitului (1977)
 Cât de mic poate fi infernul? (1993), Editura Odeon

See also
Romulus Bărbulescu

References

1941 births
2013 deaths
People from Măgurele
Romanian male novelists
Romanian science fiction writers
Romanian translators
20th-century Romanian novelists
20th-century translators
20th-century Romanian male writers
University of Bucharest alumni